Ghost light or ghostlight may refer to:

Atmospheric ghost lights, lights (or fires) that appear in the atmosphere without an obvious cause
 Aleya (Ghost light), in Bengal state of India
Brown Mountain Lights, lights that can be seen from the Blue Ridge Parkway in North Carolina, USA
Cohoke Light, a phenomenon reported near West Point, Virginia
 Chir Batti in Rann of Kutch area in Gujarat state of India
Hessdalen lights, unexplained lights observed in rural central Norway
Light of Saratoga, a legend from the Big Thicket region of southeast Texas, USA
Maco light, occasionally seen between the late 19th century and 1977 in North Carolina, USA
Marfa lights, a phenomenon reported in west Texas, USA
Min Min light, an unexplained light phenomenon that has often been reported in outback Australia
Naga fireball, a phenomenon said to be seen annually on the Mekong River
Paulding Light, a light that appears in a valley outside Paulding, Michigan
The Spooklight, a ghost light on U.S. Route 66
St. Elmo's fire, a weather phenomenon of an electrical aura
St. Louis Light, also known as the St. Louis Ghost Light, Saskatchewan, Canada
Will-o'-the-wisp, also called ghost-light in some countries, a natural phenomenon producing a ghostly light sometimes seen at night or twilight over bogs, swamps, and marshes
Ghost light (theatre), a light left lit overnight in a theater

Things named after ghost light(s)
Ghost Light (Doctor Who), a 1989 serial from the British TV series
Ghost Light, a 2010 novel by Joseph O'Connor
Ghostlight, a 1995 novel by Marion Zimmer Bradley
Ghostlight Theatre, a theater company in North Tonawanda, New York
Ghostlights, a 2016 album by German metal supergroup Avantasia
Mater and the Ghostlight, a 2006 Pixar computer animated short created for the DVD of Cars
 Ghost Light (2018 film), a 2018 American horror film
 Ghost Light (band), a jam band from Philadelphia, Pennsylvania
 Ghostlight, a 2022 album by Finnish rock band Poets of the Fall
 "Ghost Light", a 2022 single by TheFatRat and Everglow

See also
Gurdon Light, a mystery light located near railroad tracks in Arkansas, USA
Will-o'-the-wisp, folklore and sightings related to the ghost lights